Krystofer Barch (born March 26, 1980) is a Canadian former professional ice hockey forward. He is currently serving as a development coach within the Buffalo Sabres organization.

Playing career
Barch was drafted 106th overall in the 1998 NHL Entry Draft by the Washington Capitals. Barch played his junior hockey with the London Knights of the Ontario Hockey League. In his three years with London, Barch had 123 points in 187 games while tallying 206 penalty minutes.

Unsigned by the Capitals, Barch signed as a free agent with the Dallas Stars on July 18, 2006. Barch made his NHL debut in the 2006–07 season on January 15, 2007 against the Los Angeles Kings after being called up due to injuries. He remained with the Stars for the remainder of the season, played in 26 of 37 games and scored 3 goals and 2 assists for 5 points. Known as a hard-hitter, Barch had 107 penalty minutes, which included 13 fighting majors.

On January 29, 2009, Barch had eight teeth shattered from a high stick by defenceman Chris Chelios, despite wearing a protective mouthguard, in a game with the Detroit Red Wings.

On December 7, 2011, the Dallas Stars traded Barch and a 6th-round pick in the 2012 draft, to the Florida Panthers in exchange for the minor league forward Jake Hauswirth and a 5th-round pick in 2012.

On December 31, 2011, in a game against the Montreal Canadiens, Barch was given a game misconduct penalty at the end of the first period, following an incident between teammate Erik Gudbranson and P.K. Subban. Hockey Night in Canada on CBC reported that the ejection was due to Barch making what was deemed to be a racial slur against Subban, who is of Jamaican descent. The incident was witnessed by linesman Darren Gibbs who was standing in front of the players' benches. Barch was suspended one game by the NHL for his comment.

Barch signed a two-year contract with the New Jersey Devils on July 5, 2012. On September 28, 2013, Barch was traded with a seventh round pick to Florida for a sixth round pick and Scott Timmins.

Personal life
Krys and his wife Holly have three children: sons Hayden, born April 14, 2007, Kane, and Kolten.

Career statistics

References

External links

1980 births
Living people
Buffalo Sabres coaches
Canadian ice hockey left wingers
Dallas Stars players
Florida Panthers players
Greenville Grrrowl players
Ice hockey people from Ontario
Iowa Stars players
London Knights players
Ontario Junior Hockey League players
New Jersey Devils players
Norfolk Admirals players
Portland Pirates players
Richmond Renegades players
Sportspeople from Hamilton, Ontario
Washington Capitals draft picks
Canadian ice hockey coaches